Thomas Lawrence Keane (September 7, 1926 – June 19, 2001) was an American football cornerback.

High school
Keane played football and graduated from Linsly Military Institute in Wheeling, West Virginia (now known as the Linsly School) in 1944. During his high school career, he was an All-OVAC selection in football and basketball in 1943 and 1944. He was also All-City in basketball.

College
He then went to play football at Ohio State University where he lettered as a freshman. After freshman year, he joined the United States Navy where he served for 20 months. After the navy he enrolled at West Virginia University, where he lettered in football in 1946 and 1947.

Professional football
Keane was a third round selection and 18th overall pick in the 1948 NFL Draft. He was selected by the Los Angeles Rams. He played four years with the Rams, where he won the 1951 NFL title. In 1952, the Rams traded him to the expansion Dallas Texans, one of eleven players sent to Dallas in exchange for future Hall of Famer Les Richter. (Of the eleven, Keane turned out to be the only one to play in the NFL beyond 1952; six of them never played a down for Dallas or any other NFL team.) Due to injuries, he was occasionally used on offense, catching three passes for 73 yards. After the Texans dissolved, Keane played two years with the Baltimore Colts and ended his career with the Chicago Cardinals in 1955. During his career he was selected All-Pro twice and played in the 1953 Pro Bowl.

Coaching career
Keane served as an assistant for the Chicago Cardinals from 1957–1959. From 1962–1964 he served as Head Coach of the Wheeling Ironmen of the United Football League. Then he went back to the NFL to the Pittsburgh Steelers as an assistant in 1965. He served as a longtime assistant to the Miami Dolphins where he coached from 1966–1985. He was one of the assistants on the 1972 undefeated Miami Dolphins team under head coach Don Shula.

References

Tom Keane, OVAC Hall of Fame

1926 births
2001 deaths
Sports coaches from Miami
Players of American football from Miami
Sportspeople from Wheeling, West Virginia
American football cornerbacks
West Virginia Mountaineers football players
Los Angeles Rams players
Dallas Texans (NFL) players
Baltimore Colts players
Chicago Cardinals players
Western Conference Pro Bowl players
Linsly School alumni
People from Bellaire, Ohio
Ohio State Buckeyes football players
Chicago Cardinals coaches
Pittsburgh Steelers coaches
Miami Dolphins coaches
United States Navy personnel of World War II